In macroeconomics, the twin deficits hypothesis or the twin deficits phenomenon, is the observation that, theoretically, there is a strong causal link between a nation's government budget balance and its current account balance.

Definition
Standard macroeconomic theory points to how a budget deficit can be a contributing factor to a current account deficit. This link can be seen from considering the national accounting model of the economy:

where Y represents national income or GDP, C is consumption, I is investment, G is government spending and X–M stands for net exports.  This represents GDP because all the production in an economy (the left hand side of the equation) is used as consumption (C), investment (I), government spending (G), and goods that are exported in excess of imports (NX).  Another equation defining GDP using alternative terms (which in theory results in the same value) is

where Y is again GDP, C is consumption, S is private saving, and T is taxes. This is because national income is also equal to output, and all individual income either goes to pay for consumption (C), to pay taxes (T), or is saved (S).

Proof

Since
, and
 
, then

, which simplifies to the sectoral balances identity

If (T-G) is negative, we have a budget deficit.

Now, assume an economy already at potential output, meaning Y is fixed. In this case, if the budget deficit increases, and saving remains the same, then this last equation implies that either investment (I) must fall (see crowding out), or net exports (NX) must fall, causing a trade deficit.  Hence, a budget deficit can also lead to a trade deficit, causing a twin deficit.

Though the economics guiding which of the two is used to finance the government deficit can get more complicated than what is shown above, the essence of it is that if foreigners' savings pay for the budget deficit, the current account deficit grows. If the country's own citizens' savings finance the borrowing, it may cause a crowding out effect (in an economy at or near potential output, or full employment).

Example

In the US, the budget deficit is financed about half from foreigners, half domestically.  Therefore, with an additional $400 billion deficit, the trade deficit would, according to the theory, be increased by some $200 billion.

An economy is deemed to have a double deficit if it has a current account deficit and a fiscal deficit. In effect, the economy is borrowing from foreigners in exchange for foreign-made goods.  Traditional macroeconomics predicts that persistent double deficits will lead to currency devaluation/depreciation that can be severe and sudden.

In the case of the United States, the twin deficit graph as a percentage of GDP shows that the budget and current account deficits did move broadly in sync from 1981 until the early 1990s, but since then, they have moved apart. Data thus confirm that as a government budget deficit widens, the current account falls, but the relationship is complicated by what happens to investment and private saving.

Current Account = (Private Saving – Investment) + (Taxes levied – Government Expenditure)

In the above equation, it is verifiable that CA will deteriorate as government expenditure exceeds the amount of tax is collected.

One way to understand this process intuitively is by thinking through two different markets.  First consider the Foreign Exchange market.  At equilibrium the quantity supplied = the quantity demanded.  Thus, Imports + Capital outflow = Exports + Capital Inflow.  Rearranging this equation we find that Imports – Exports = Capital Inflow – Capital Outflow.  Because Imports – Exports = Trade Deficit and Capital Inflow – Capital Outflow = Net Capital Inflow, we get the equation Trade Deficit = Net Capital Inflow (or Current Account deficit = Capital Account Surplus).

Next we must consider the market for loan able funds.  The equilibrium here is Saving + Net Capital Inflow = Investment + Budget Deficit.  However, taking the Forex market into consideration we know that the Trade Deficit is equal to Net Capital Inflow. We can thus substitute for:

Saving + Trade Deficit = Investment + Budget Deficit.

Rearranging algebraically we find that:

Budget Deficit = Saving + Trade Deficit – Investment.

What we can gather from this is the understanding of why an increased budget deficit goes up and down in tandem with the Trade Deficit.  This is where we derive the appellation the Twin Deficits: if the US budget deficit goes up then either household savings must go up, the trade deficit must go up, or private investment will decrease.

See also

References

Further reading

 Understanding the Twin Deficits: New Approaches, New Results FRBSF Economic Letter. 

Government finances
United States federal budgets
Union budgets of India
Macroeconomic theories